Petite bourgeoisie (literally 'small bourgeoisie'; also anglicised as petty bourgeoisie) is a French term that refers to a social class composed of semi-autonomous peasants and small-scale merchants whose politico-economic ideological stance in times of socioeconomic stability is determined by reflecting that of a haute bourgeoisie ('high' bourgeoisie) with which the petite bourgeoisie seeks to identify itself and whose bourgeois morality it strives to imitate.

The term is politico-economic and references historical materialism. It originally denoted a sub-stratum of the middle classes in the 18th and early-19th centuries. In the mid-19th century, the German economist Karl Marx and other Marxist theorists used the term petite bourgeoisie to identify the socio-economic stratum of the bourgeoisie that consists of small shopkeepers and self-employed artisans.

Definition 

The petite bourgeoisie is economically distinct from the proletariat and the  social-class strata who rely entirely on the sale of their labor-power for survival. Although members of the petite bourgeoisie can buy the labor of others, they typically work alongside their employees, unlike the haute bourgeoisie.

The petite bourgeoisie is little-defined in Marx's own work, with only the words 'smaller capitalists' used in The Communist Manifesto.

Role in fascism 
Historically, Karl Marx predicted that the petite bourgeoisie was to lose in the course of economic development. Following this, R. J. B. Bosworth suggested that it was to become the political mainstay of fascism, which represented in political form a terroristic response to their inevitable loss of power (economic, political, and social) to the haute bourgeoisie. 

Wilhelm Reich also highlighted the principal support of the rise of fascism in Germany given by the petite bourgeoisie and middle class in The Mass Psychology of Fascism. He claimed that the middle classes were a hotbed for political reaction due to their reliance on the patriarchal family (according to Reich, small businesses are often self-exploiting enterprises of families headed by the father, whose morality binds the family together in their somewhat precarious economic position) and the sexual repression that underlies it.

This was disputed by historian Richard Pipes who wrote, in the case of the Nazi Party, that while at first limited to this group, by the end of the 1920s workers joined the party en masse and were the largest occupational group in the party by 1934.

Literary treatment of the petite bourgeoisie 

Søren Kierkegaard wrote that "the petty bourgeois is spiritless[.] ... Devoid of imagination, as the petty bourgeois always is, he lives within a certain orbit of trivial experiences as to how things come about, what is possible, what usually happens, no matter whether he is a tapster or a prime minister. This is the way the petty bourgeois has lost himself and God". According to him, the petite bourgeoisie exemplifies a spiritual emptiness that is rooted in an overemphasis on the worldly, rather than the inwardness of the self. However, Kierkegaard's indictment relies less on a class analysis of the petite bourgeoisie than on the perception of a worldview which was common in his middle-class milieu.

In fact, though there have been many depictions of the petite bourgeoisie in literature as well as in cartoons, based on an image of their overly conventional practicality, the realities of the petite bourgeoisie throughout the 19th century were more complex. All the same, writers have been concerned with petite bourgeois morality and behavior and have portrayed them as undesirable characters. Henrik Ibsen's An Enemy of the People was a play written in direct response to the reception of another one of his plays for making "indecent" references to syphilis and in general his work was considered scandalous in its disregard for the morality of the period. Later, Bertolt Brecht's concern with Nazism and his Marxist politics got him interested in exploring the petite bourgeois mind and this interest led him to represent the petite bourgeoisie repeatedly throughout his work (one was even titled The Seven Deadly Sins of the Petite Bourgeoisie).

In his book Two Cheers for Anarchism: Six Easy Pieces on Autonomy, Dignity, and Meaningful Work and Play, James C. Scott dedicates an entire chapter to describing some features of the petite bourgeoisie. First, he points out the contempt of this class by Marxists due to the ambiguity of their political position. He further points out that this position of contempt or distaste encompasses both the socialist bloc and large capitalist democracies, due to the difficulty of monitoring, taxing and policing of this class. This difficulty results from the complexity, variety and mobility of activities taken on by this class. He points out the petite bourgeoisie has existed for most of civilized history. He also states that even those who are not part of the class have to some degree desired to become small property owners, due to the conferred autonomy and social standing. He continues that the desire to keep and restore lost land has been the leitmotif of most radically egalitarian mass movements. He argues that the petite bourgeoisie have an indispensable economic role in terms of invention and innovation, citing as an example software startups that develop ideas which are then usually bought by larger firms. He also points out that small shopkeepers provide several "unpaid" social services such as:

See also 
 Professional–managerial class
 Kulak
 Petty nobility
 Producerism
 Worker aristocracy
 Xiaozi

References

Further reading 
 Andrews, G. J. and Phillips D R (2005) Petit Bourgeois healthcare? The big small-business of private complementary medical practice Complementary Therapies in Clinical Practice 11, 87-104.
 F. Bechhofer and B. Elliott, Persistence and change the petit bourgeoisie in the industrial society, Eur J Soc xv 11 (1976), pp. 74–79.
 B. Elliott and G. McCrone, What else does someone with capital do?, New Soc 31 (1979), pp. 512–513.
 F. Bechhofer and B. Elliott, The petite Bourgeoisie comparative studies of an uneasy stratum, Macmillan, London (1981).
 R. Scase and R. Goffee, The real world of the small business owner, Croom Helm, London (1981).
 D.R. Phillips and J. Vincent, Petit Bourgeois Care private residential care for the elderly, Policy Politics 14 (1986) (2), pp. 189–208.
 Geoffrey Crossick and Heinz-Gerhard Haupt, The Petite Bourgeoisie in Europe 1780-1914. Routledge. 1998.
 "Petite bourgeoisie" at the Encyclopedia of Marxism.

External links 
 

19th-century neologisms
French words and phrases
Social groups
Marxist terminology
Middle class
Bourgeoisie